James Isaac Whelpton (1887–1944) was an English footballer who played in the Football League for Huddersfield Town, Grimsby Town and Bournemouth & Boscombe Athletic. He was on the books of Lincoln City and Birmingham, without playing league football for either, and also played non-league football for Castleford Town and Guildford United.

References

Sources

1887 births
1944 deaths
English footballers
Footballers from Sheffield
Association football goalkeepers
Lincoln City F.C. players
Birmingham City F.C. players
Castleford Town F.C. players
Huddersfield Town A.F.C. players
Guildford City F.C. players
Grimsby Town F.C. players
AFC Bournemouth players
English Football League players